Call of the Wild is the eighth studio album by German power metal band Powerwolf. Released on 16 July 2021, the work was published through Napalm Records.

Critical reception 
Call of the Wild received positive reviews from critics, who praised its direction and production. Paul Travers of Kerrang stated that "The symphonic elements that were really pushed forward on The Sacrament Of Sin carry on where they left off and only serve to make the band even more bombastic". Holly Wright of Louder stated that "Call Of The Wild points at Powerwolf's growing aspirations for domination", going on to state that "The production is shinier and there's a distinct lack of willy jokes, although their heretical romp, "Undress To Confess", preserves the twinkle in their eye".

Track listing

Personnel 
Attila Dorn – vocals
Matthew Greywolf – lead and rhythm guitar
Charles Greywolf – bass, rhythm guitar
Roel van Helden – drums, percussion
Falk Maria Schlegel – organ, keyboards

Charts

References 

Powerwolf albums
2021 albums
Napalm Records albums
Albums produced by Jens Bogren